Constituency PK-69 (Peshawar-IV) is a constituency for the Khyber Pakhtunkhwa Assembly of the Khyber Pakhtunkhwa province of Pakistan.

Members of Parliament

Since 2018: PK-69 (Peshawar-IV)

2013–2018: PK-04 (Peshawar-IV)

2002–2013: PF-04 (Peshawar-IV)

Elections 2013

See also

 Government of Khyber Pakhtunkhwa
 Khyber Pakhtunkhwa Assembly
 Constituency PK-01 (Peshawar-I)
 Constituency PK-02 (Peshawar-II)
 Constituency PK-03 (Peshawar-III)
 Constituency PK-05 (Peshawar-V)
 Constituency PK-06 (Peshawar-VI)
 Constituency PK-07 (Peshawar-VII)
 Constituency PK-08 (Peshawar-VIII)
 Constituency PK-09 (Peshawar-IX)
 Constituency PK-10 (Peshawar-X)
 Constituency PK-11 (Peshawar-XI)

References

External links 
 Khyber Pakhtunkhwa Assembly's official website
 Election Commission of Pakistan's official website
 Awaztoday.com Search Result
 Election Commission Pakistan Search Result

Khyber Pakhtunkhwa Assembly constituencies